State Route 320 (SR 320) is a state highway in Lincoln County, Nevada, United States. Known as the Caselton Mine Loop, the highway is a loop route of U.S. Route 93 (US 93) near Pioche serving the Caselton Mining District.

Major intersections

See also

References

320
Transportation in Lincoln County, Nevada